Treasure of the Aztecs (German: Der Schatz der Azteken) is a 1921 German silent adventure film directed by Karl Heiland and starring Otto Gebühr and Theodor Loos.

Cast
 Otto Gebühr
 Theodor Loos
 Loo Holl
 Friedrich Kühne

References

Bibliography
 Hans-Michael Bock & Michael Töteberg. Das Ufa-Buch. Zweitausendeins, 1992.

External links

1921 films
Films of the Weimar Republic
Films directed by Karl Heiland
German silent feature films
1921 adventure films
German adventure films
UFA GmbH films
German black-and-white films
Silent adventure films
1920s German films
1920s German-language films